Alexander Leonidovich Yanshin (1911, Smolensk - 1999, Moscow) was a Soviet Russian geologist, Academician of the USSR Academy of Sciences (since 1958).
From 1982 to 1988, Yanshin served as vice-president of the USSR Academy of Sciences.
From 1967, Yanshin served as president of the Moscow Society of Naturalists.

His father was a lawyer.
He studied at the Moscow State University.

He received the Candidate's degree from the USSR Academy of Sciences in 1937.
In 1952, he defended his doctoral dissertation.
He was elected a Member of the USSR Academy of Sciences in 1958.

Honors and awards

 Order of the Red Banner of Labour (1944)
 Order of the Badge of Honour (1945)
 Alexander Karpinsky Prize (1953)
 Order of Lenin (1967, 1971, 1981)
 USSR State Prize (1969, 1978)
 Alexander Karpinsky Gold Medal (1973)
 Hero of Socialist Labour (1981)
 Order of the October Revolution (1986)
 Alexander Pavlovich Vinogradov Prize (1994)

Links

1911 births
1999 deaths
Full Members of the USSR Academy of Sciences
Soviet geologists
Heroes of Socialist Labour
Recipients of the USSR State Prize